Sadagoppan Ramesh (சடகோபன் ரமேஷ்) (born 13 October 1975) is a former Indian cricketer and actor who appeared in Tamil movies. He is a left-handed batsman and a right-arm offbreak bowler. In September 1999, he became the first Indian cricketer to take a wicket off his first ball in ODI cricket.

Cricket career
Despite having a batting average of over 50 in his first six tests and proving that he could easily play against top bowlers, he did not convert his starts into big scores. He was removed from the team after India's tour of Sri Lanka when Ramesh passed 30 runs in 5 out of the 6 innings but only one innings was converted to a 50. Though he originally played for Tamil Nadu, he played domestic cricket for Kerala during 2005–06, 2006–07 seasons and Assam in the 2007–08 season.

Film career
Ramesh has acted in a Tamil movie, Santosh Subramaniam, released in April 2008. He also played a lead actor for the first time in the movie Potta Potti.

Personal life
Ramesh married Aparna in 2002. They have a daughter.

Business career
In 2019, Ramesh invested in 'Swaraas', a multipurpose karaoke studio.

References

External links 
 
 

1975 births
Living people
India One Day International cricketers
India Test cricketers
Indian cricketers
Tamil Nadu cricketers
Kerala cricketers
Assam cricketers
South Zone cricketers
Tamil sportspeople
Cricketers from Chennai
Cricketers who have acted in films